La mexicana y el güero (International title: I Love You, Güero) is a Mexican telenovela produced by Nicandro Díaz González that aired on Las Estrellas from 17 August 2020 to 7 February 2021. It is an adaptation of the Chilean telenovela titled Cómplices created by Víctor Carrasco and Vicente Sabatini. The story revolves around Andrea (Itatí Cantoral), a beautiful swindler, and Tyler (Juan Soler), an idealistic millionaire who returns to Mexico in search of his biological family after his adoptive mother dies and tells him to return to his place of origin.

Plot 
Andrea Ibarrola (Itatí Cantoral) is a professional con artist, who uses her beauty, intelligence and charm to fool her victims. In the United States, Andrea has an accomplice named Olinka (Sabine Moussier), who gives her information about Tyler Somers (Juan Soler), her next victim. He is the largest producer of Idaho quality potatoes in the world and at the same time he is a kind and noble man. Tyler was adopted, Rose (Lorena Velázquez) his adoptive mother asks him to find his biological mother Matilde Rojas. Andrea begins to devise a master plan for Tyler to believe that he has found his biological family. She gets in touch with him, saying that she is his sister and that his real mother wants to see him, like the rest of the family, who await him in Mexico with open arms. Andrea hires seven people with financial difficulties to join this fake family. Thanks to the substantial pay, everyone agrees to play their role. Tyler is impressed upon meeting Andrea, his supposed sister. Andrea also immediately feels something very special for him. Having truly fallen in love with her victim, Andrea will have to choose between continuing with her plan or love.

Cast

Main 
 Itatí Cantoral as Andrea Ibarrola Gil
 Juan Soler as Tyler Somers
 Luis Roberto Guzmán as René Fajardo
 Jacqueline Andere as Matilde "Maty" Rojas
 Nora Salinas as Helena Peñaloza de Heredia
 Irán Castillo as Gladys Carmona
 Julio Camejo as Mario Nava
 Gala Montes as Katya Ibarrola Gil
 Sian Chiong as Diego Torres
 Eleazar Gómez as Sebastián de la Mora 
 Jackie Sauza as Erika Núñez
 Gabriela Zamora as Marcia Serrano
 Pablo Valentín as Luis Ayala
 Laura Vignatti as Sofía Gastelum de Nava
 Miguel Martínez as Ignacio Santoyo de la Mora
 Gabriela Carrillo as Paulina Villaseñor
 Montserrat Marañón as Chabela
 Patricio Castillo as Jaime Salvatorre
 Alejandra Procuna as Isis de Robles
 José Montini as Bonifacio Robles
 Tania Lizardo as Zulema Gutiérrez
 Daniela Álvarez as Viiyéri Neiya Robles
 Rodrigo Brand as Brandon Heredia Peñaloza
 Elaine Haro as Rocío Heredia Peñaloza
 Danielle Lefaure as Megan Robin
 Lara Campos as Melody Nava Gastelum
 Rodrigo Abed as Gonzalo Heredia
 Sabine Moussier as Olinka Cohen
 Ferdinando Valencia as Sebastián de la Mora

Special guest stars 
 Lorena Velázquez as Rose Somers
 Horacio Pancheri as Rodrigo Avellaneda
 Rocío Banquells as María Dolores "Lolita" Santoyo de la Mora
 Omar Fierro as Agustín Gastellum
 Xavier Marc as Malacara
 Aleida Núñez as Rosenda
 Octavio Ocaña as Sr. Cruz
 Lucero Lander as Piedad de la Mora de Santoyo
 Martha Julia as Vanessa Larios
 Norma Lazareno as Crucita
 María Prado as Dulce
 Erika Buenfil as Doctor Mónica Traven
 Ana Martín as Toñita

Production 
Filming was originally scheduled for March 2020, but due to the COVID-19 pandemic in Mexico, it was suspended. However, filming began on 9 June 2020 in forums 10 and 15 of Televisa San Ángel. A blessing ceremony was held as Televisa usually does every year, where actors who are part of the cast were present as Itatí Cantoral , Juan Soler, Luis Roberto Guzmán, Jacqueline Andere, Patricio Castillo, Nora Salinas, Gala Montes, Laura Vignatti, and Rodrigo Abed. On 19 June 2020, the People en Español website confirmed the addition of new actors such as Julio Camejo, and Lara Campos.

Ratings 
 
}}

Episodes

Notes

References

External links 
 

2020 telenovelas
2020 Mexican television series debuts
2021 Mexican television series endings
2020s Mexican drama television series
Televisa telenovelas
Mexican telenovelas
Spanish-language telenovelas
Mexican television series based on Chilean television series
2020s LGBT-related drama television series
Mexican LGBT-related television shows